The fourth cabinet of Alexandru Vaida-Voevod was the government of Romania from 14 January to 13 November 1933.

Ministers
The ministers of the cabinet were as follows:

President of the Council of Ministers:
Alexandru Vaida-Voevod (14 January - 13 November 1933)
Vice President of the Council of Ministers and Minister of the Interior:
Gheorghe Mironescu (14 January - 13 November 1933)
Minister of Foreign Affairs: 
Nicolae Titulescu (14 January - 13 November 1933)
Minister of Finance:
Virgil Madgearu (14 January - 13 November 1933)
Minister of Justice:
Mihai Popovici (14 January - 13 November 1933)
Minister of Public Instruction, Religious Affairs, and the Arts:
Dimitrie Gusti (14 January - 13 November 1933)
Minister of National Defence:

Gen. Nicolae Samsonovici (14 January - 13 November 1933)

Minister of Agriculture and Property

Voicu Nițescu (14 January - 13 November 1933)

Minister of Industry and Commerce:

Ion Lugoșianu (14 January - 14 June 1933)
Alexandru Vaida-Voevod (14 June - 13 November 1933)
Minister of Labour, Health, and Social Security:

D. R. Ioanițescu (14 January - 13 November 1933)

Minister of Public Works and Communications:

Eduart Mirto (14 January - 13 November 1933)

Ministers of State:
Pantelimon Halippa (14 January - 13 November 1933)
Emil Hațieganu (14 January - 13 November 1933)

References

Cabinets of Romania
Cabinets established in 1933
Cabinets disestablished in 1933
1933 establishments in Romania
1933 disestablishments in Romania